Samuel David Barrett (22 January 1905 – 21 December 1984) was an Australian rules footballer who played for the Richmond Football Club in the Victorian Football League (VFL).

References

External links 

Tigerland Archive Profile

1905 births
1984 deaths
Australian rules footballers from Melbourne
Richmond Football Club players
People from Brunswick, Victoria